Vasitis nodosa is a complication experienced in approximately 66% of men who undergo vasectomy. It is a benign nodular thickening of the vas deferens, in which small offshoots proliferate, infiltrating surrounding tissue.  It can be mistaken for low-grade adenocarcinoma by pathologists, and is implicated in late vasectomy failure.

See also
Salpingitis isthmica nodosa

References

Contraception for males
Sterilization (medicine)
Male genital disorders